Akshay Yadav (born 25 October 1986) is an Indian politician belonging to Samajwadi Party in Uttar Pradesh. He was member of the 16th Lok Sabha from Firozabad and had won with a margin of 1,14,000 votes.
He lost to Chandrasen Jadon of Bharatiya Janta Party by around 28,800 votes in the 17th Lok Sabha from Firozabad.

Early life 
Akshay Yadav was born in Etawah, Uttar Pradesh, India, on 25 October 1986 to Ram Gopal Yadav and Phoolan Devi. His mother Phoolan died in August 2010.

He had 1 sister and 2 brothers. His brother Asit Yadav (Billu Yadav) died in a road accident in 1999.

Akshay was educated at Amity University, Noida and Deep Memorial Public School, Ghaziabad.

Personal life
Akshay Yadav is married to Dr. Richa Yadav since 10 February 2010 and the couple has a son and a daughter.

Positions held 
Akshay Yadav has served 1 time as Lok Sabha MP.

References

Living people
India MPs 2014–2019
Lok Sabha members from Uttar Pradesh
People from Etawah
People from Firozabad district
Place of birth missing (living people)
Akshay
1986 births
Samajwadi Party politicians from Uttar Pradesh